Brandscheid is an Ortsgemeinde – a community belonging to a Verbandsgemeinde – in the Westerwaldkreis in Rhineland-Palatinate, Germany.

Geography

Brandscheid lies on a mountain slope in the broad woodlands west of Westerburg. Since 1972 it has belonged to what was then the newly founded Verbandsgemeinde of Westerburg, a kind of collective municipality.

Economy and infrastructure

Northwest of the community runs Bundesstraße 255 leading from Montabaur to Herborn. The nearest Autobahn interchange is Montabaur on the A 3. The nearest InterCityExpress stop is the railway station at Montabaur on the Cologne-Frankfurt high-speed rail line.

References

External links
 Brandscheid in the collective municipality’s Web pages 

Municipalities in Rhineland-Palatinate
Westerwaldkreis